Flea allergy dermatitis is an eczematous itchy skin disease of dogs and cats. For both of these domestic species, flea allergy dermatitis is the most common cause of skin disease. Affected animals develop allergic reactions to chemicals in flea saliva. Symptoms of this reaction include erythema (redness), papules (bumps), pustules (pus-filled bumps), and crusts (scabs). If severe, hair loss will occur in the affected area. Dogs with flea allergy dermatitis often show hair loss and eczematous skin rash on the lower back, upper tail, neck, and down the back of the legs. Cats with flea allergy dermatitis may develop a variety of skin problems, including feline eosinophilic granuloma, miliary dermatitis, or self-inflicted alopecia from excessive grooming.

Cause
The flea found most commonly on both dogs and cats with a flea infestation is the cat flea, Ctenocephalides felis. Pets that develop flea allergy dermatitis have an allergic response to flea saliva injected during flea feeding. The itch associated with just one flea bite persists long after that flea is gone and leads to significant self-trauma.

Diagnosis
The diagnosis of flea allergy dermatitis is complicated by the grooming habits of pets. Cats in particular are very efficient at grooming out fleas, often removing any evidence of infestation. Fleas begin biting within 5 minutes of finding a host, and there are no flea treatments that kill fleas before biting occurs.

Treatment

The aim of treatment is to relieve the allergy-induced itch and to remove the fleas from the pet and its home environment. In some cases, secondary bacterial or yeast infections will also need treatment before the itching subsides. The administration of oral or topical flea prevention is also required to kill fleas currently on the animal.

Environmental flea control includes using flea foggers or bombs, vacuuming, and treating pet bedding by washing on a hot cycle (over 60 degrees Celsius) in the washing machine. 

Many pets with flea allergy dermatitis may also have other allergies, such as allergies to food, contact allergies, and atopic dermatitis.

See also
Dog skin disorders
Cat skin disorders

References

Cat diseases
Dog diseases